How the West Was One, released in 1977, is a three-LP live album featuring 2nd Chapter of Acts, Phil Keaggy and a band called David. The album was a collection of songs recorded in a series of 18 concerts held throughout the western United States in 1977. It was also 2nd Chapter of Acts' final release for Myrrh Records.

Half the album (sides 1, 5 and 6) was performed by 2nd Chapter of Acts and half by Phil Keaggy. The two artists backed each other up throughout. Besides material from previous albums by both artists, the album features two songs from Annie Herring's first solo album Through a Child's Eyes and three otherwise unavailable songs (one each by Keaggy, Matthew Ward with Richard Souther, and Herring).

Track listing
From Discogs.
Side one
 Concert Intro – 2:26
 "Hey, Watcha Say" – 3:38
 Song Intro – 0:34
 "Keep On Shinin'" – 3:27
 Song Intro – 1:08
 "I Fall in Love"/"Change" – 4:43
 "Now That I Belong to You" – 3:43
 Phil's Intro – 0:23

Side two
 Song Intro – 0:42
 "What a Day" – 5:56
 Song Intro – 1:00
 "Love Broke Thru" – 3:37
 Song Intro – 0:27
 "Take Me Closer" – 5:07
 Song Intro – 0:23
 "My Life" – 5:39

Side three
 Song Intro – 0:07
 "Another Try" – 5:25
 Song Intro – 0:17
 "Rejoice" – 16:22

Side four
 Song Intro – 0:03
 "Just the Same" – 4:08
 Song Intro – 0:06
 "Hallelujah" – 5:47
 "Time" – 9:44

Side five
 Song Intro – 1:10
 "Easter Song" – 3:45
 Song Intro – 1:02
 "Dance With You" – 3:08
 "Which Way the Wind Blows" – 4:44
 Song Intro – 2:44
 "Something Tells Me" – 3:52

Side six
 "Yaweh" – 3:24
 Song Intro – 1:46
 "PS 61" – 2:32
 "Grinding Stone" – 2:43
 "Receive" – 3:52
 Song Intro – 0:30
 Medley: "Morning Comes When You Call" and "The Son Comes Over the Hill" – 6:20

Personnel
 Wally Duguid – engineer
 Nelly Greisen – vocals
 Gene Gunnels – drums
 Annie Herring – piano, vocals
 Buck Herring – producer, mixer, concert intro
 Phil Keaggy – guitar, vocals
 Herb Melton – bass
 Richard Souther – piano, multi-keyboards, background vocals
 Matthew Ward – vocals
 Peter York – rhythm guitar, background vocals

References

1977 live albums
2nd Chapter of Acts albums
Live Christian music albums
Collaborative albums